The 2004 CAR Development Trophy was the third edition of lower level rugby union tournament in Africa.
After a preliminary, the teams were divided in three pools, with a final between the winner of each of them.

Preliminary

First round

Pool South

Pool North "A"

Pool North "B"

Final Pool

See also 
2004 Africa Cup

References 
  Africa Cup 2004 Espn-Scum.com

2004
2004 rugby union tournaments for national teams
2004 in African rugby union